Dr Leela Joshi is an Indian gynaecologist and social worker known for her work with tribal women and teenage girls suffering from Anemia in Ratlam district. Nicknamed as the Mother Teresa of the Malwa region, Dr Joshi was conferred Padma Shri in 2020.

Career
Dr Joshi began her career as an assistant surgeon with Indian Railways in Kota, Rajasthan. She retired from the railways in 1997 from the position of Chief Medical Director. After retiring from active service, Dr Joshi moved to Ratlam district in Madhya Pradesh where she started providing free healthcare service to tribal women and children.

She was listed among top 100 influential women of the country in a survey carried out by Dept of Women and Child Development and in 2020, she was awarded the Padma Shri India's fourth highest civilian award  for her work amongst Tribals  in Madhya Pradesh.

References

Living people
Recipients of the Padma Shri in medicine
Year of birth missing (living people)